Brian Sites (born June 21, 1983) is an American actor. He has guest-starred in television series like 7th Heaven, Boston Public, Crossing Jordan, The Ellen Show, CSI: Crime Scene Investigation and had brief recurring roles on 8 Simple Rules and That's So Raven.

He also had roles in the feature films Gigli, Real Women Have Curves and Terminator 3: Rise of the Machines.

Filmography

Film

Television

References

External links

1983 births
Living people
21st-century American male actors
Male actors from California
American male film actors
American male television actors
People from Visalia, California